Dolianthus is a genus of flowering plants in the family Rubiaceae. The genus is endemic to New Guinea.

Species 
Dolianthus archboldianus (Merr. & L.M.Perry) A.P.Davis
Dolianthus bicolor (Merr. & L.M.Perry) A.P.Davis
Dolianthus buxifolius (C.H.Wright) A.P.Davis
Dolianthus clemensiae (Merr. & L.M.Perry) A.P.Davis
Dolianthus epiphyticus (Valeton) A.P.Davis
Dolianthus fimbristipularis (P.Royen) A.P.Davis
Dolianthus kairoi A.P.Davis
Dolianthus montiswilhelmii (P.Royen) A.P.Davis
Dolianthus nummatus (P.Royen) A.P.Davis
Dolianthus ovatifolius A.P.Davis
Dolianthus subalpinus (P.Royen) A.P.Davis
Dolianthus trichanthus (Merr. & L.M.Perry) A.P.Davis
Dolianthus archboldianus C.H.Wright

References

External links 
 Dolianthus in the World Checklist of Rubiaceae

Rubiaceae genera
Psychotrieae
Endemic flora of New Guinea